Brendan Ryan (born 5 February 1953) is a former Irish Labour Party politician who served as a Teachta Dála (TD) from 2011 to 2020. He was a Senator for the Administrative Panel from 2007 to 2011.

Originally from the Donabate/Portrane area, he lives in Skerries, since he married in the late 1970s. He is a younger brother of Seán Ryan, a former TD for Dublin North. He was educated at Dublin Institute of Technology, University College Dublin and Dublin City University, receiving a degree in chemistry and master's degrees in food science and business administration. He has worked as an operations manager. An unsuccessful candidate at the 2007 general election for Dublin North, he was then elected to the Administrative Panel of Seanad Éireann and served from 2007 to 2011. An active member of the Labour Party since 1978, however, he had never held any elected office or public role before his election to the Seanad. 

In 2011, he was elected to the Dáil for the first time. He was one of only seven Labour Party TDs returned to the Dáil at the 2016 general election. Of the other six, four were outgoing ministers and the other two were Ministers of State during the 31st Dáil.

On 8 January 2020, he announced that he would not be contesting the next general election.

See also
Families in the Oireachtas

References

External links

Brendan Ryan's page on the Labour Party website

 

1953 births
Living people
Alumni of Dublin City University
Alumni of University College Dublin
Alumni of Dublin Institute of Technology
Labour Party (Ireland) TDs
Members of the 23rd Seanad
Members of the 31st Dáil
Members of the 32nd Dáil
Politicians from County Dublin
Labour Party (Ireland) senators